The Westmount Examiner was a weekly English language newspaper serving Westmount, Quebec, Canada. It had a circulation of 11,000, with a policy of covering news only from within Westmount. It had been in print for over 80 years, and accompanied by an online presence beginning December 14, 2009. The paper's final issue came out on October 21, 2015.

History
Established in 1935, the Westmount Examiner initially consisted of only a few pages of local news and advertising. In 1952, its new owner, John Sancton, moved the paper to Westmount. In the late 1980s, the Sancton family sold the newspaper to Publications Dumont. It was part of the Montreal-based Transcontinental Inc.

On October 14, 2015, Transcontinental announced it would be permanently shutting down both the Westmount Examiner and its sister paper, the West Island Chronicle (including their digital online presence). The cited reason being the erosion of advertising revenue. The final issue of the Westmount Examiner was printed on October 21, 2015, with a final farewell message on the paper's website.

See also
Media in Montreal
List of Quebec media
List of newspapers in Canada

Montreal newspapers
La Presse
Le Journal de Montréal
Le Devoir
Montreal Daily News
The Montreal Star

References

External links
Westmount Examiner (official website)

English-language newspapers published in Quebec
Weekly newspapers published in Quebec
Westmount, Quebec
Publications established in 1935
1935 establishments in Quebec
2015 disestablishments in Quebec